Daydream Believers: The Monkees' Story is a 2000 American biographical drama television film about the rock and pop band the Monkees. Directed by Neill Fearnley and written by Ron McGee, the film is based on the 1996 book Hey, Hey, We're the Monkees by Harold Bronson. It stars George Stanchev as Davy Jones, L. B. Fisher as Peter Tork, Jeff Geddis as Michael Nesmith, and Aaron Lohr as Micky Dolenz. It premiered on VH1 on June 28, 2000.

Cast

Production
Filming took place in Toronto.

Reception
Ramin Zahed of Variety commended "the production for discovering four actors who are close replicas of the original Davy, Mike, Micky and Peter", and wrote that, "While Daydream Believers does not offer any deep insights or shape three-dimensional characters, it is successful in re-creating the goofy look and charms of the original NBC show." Tom Jicha of Sun-Sentinel wrote that "Daydream Believers is even hokier as a movie than the Monkees were as a group. However, approached with moderate expectations, it can be mindless summer fun."

David Dewitt of The New York Times wrote that "The film's strong acting and thematic focus trump its sometimes sketchy and formulaic dialogue." Ken Tucker of Entertainment Weekly gave the film a grade of "D+", calling the acting "fine" and the screenplay "tin-eared and full of missed opportunities."

References

External links
 
 

2000 television films
2000 films
2000 biographical drama films
2000s American films
2000s English-language films
American biographical drama films
American drama television films
Biographical films about musicians
Biographical television films
Cultural depictions of the Beatles
Cultural depictions of Jimi Hendrix
Films based on non-fiction books
Films directed by Neill Fearnley
Films scored by Fred Mollin
Films shot in Toronto
Television films based on books
The Monkees
VH1 films